The women's 1500 metres event at the 2022 African Championships in Athletics was held on 9 August in Port Louis, Mauritius.

Results

References

2022 African Championships in Athletics
1500 metres at the African Championships in Athletics